A by-election was held for the British House of Commons constituency of Hemsworth on 17 May 1934.  The seat had become vacant on the death of the Labour Member of Parliament Gabriel Price, who had held the seat since the 1931 general election.

The Labour Party considered two candidates: Absalom Flavell, from South Kirkby, and George Griffiths, secretary and organiser of the Hemsworth Divisional Labour Party.  While Flavell was supported by some affiliated bodies, he voluntarily withdrew, believing that Griffiths had stronger backing.

The Independent Labour Party considered putting forward Isaac Burns, a local councillor and miner.  The Conservative Party indicated that, if it did so, it would probably also put forward a candidate, hoping to take advantage of a split left-wing vote.  Ultimately, both parties decided not to stand, and Griffiths was elected unopposed.

See also
1946 Hemsworth by-election
1991 Hemsworth by-election
1996 Hemsworth by-election
List of United Kingdom by-elections

References

1934 elections in the United Kingdom
1934 in England
By-elections to the Parliament of the United Kingdom in West Yorkshire constituencies
Unopposed by-elections to the Parliament of the United Kingdom (need citation)
Elections in Wakefield
1930s in Yorkshire
May 1934 events
Hemsworth